Triethyl phosphate is an organic chemical compound with the formula (C2H5)3PO4 or OP(OEt)3.  It is a colorless liquid.  It is the triester of ethanol and phosphoric acid and can be called "phosphoric acid, triethyl ester".

Its primary uses are as an industrial catalyst (in acetic anhydride synthesis), a polymer resin modifier, and a plasticizer (e.g. for unsaturated polyesters). In smaller scale it is used as a solvent for e.g. cellulose acetate, flame retardant, an intermediate for pesticides and other chemicals, stabilizer for peroxides,  a strength agent for rubber and plastic including vinyl polymers and unsaturated polyesters, etc.

History
It was studied for the first time by French chemist Jean Louis Lassaigne in the early 19th century.

See also
Franz Anton Voegeli

References

Organophosphates
Plasticizers
Solvents
Ethyl esters
Phosphate esters
Flame retardants